KVJS 88.1 FM is a radio station licensed to Arroyo, Texas. The station broadcasts a Christian format and is owned by Vision Hispana Incorporated Internacional.

References

External links
KVJS's official website

VJS
Radio stations established in 2012
2012 establishments in Texas